Elisa Molinari is an Italian physicist from the University of Modena and CNR, Italy. She has been primarily interested in computational materials science and nanotechnologies, and she has been particularly active in the theory of fundamental properties of low-dimensional structures, in the simulation of nanodevices, in the development of related computational methods. She also has a continuing interest in scientific imaging and communication.

Since 2001, she has been a full professor of Condensed Matter Physics at Unimore, University of Modena and Reggio Emilia, Italy, and since 2015, she serves as Director, MaX European Centre of Excellence on 'Materials design at the exascale.'

Honors 
Molinari was awarded the status of Fellow in the American Physical Society, after she was nominated by a Forum on International Physics in 1999, for "her contribution to the theory of semiconductors and their interfaces, in particular, her fundamental work on electron-electron and electron-phonon interaction in nanostructures; and for her involvement in the training of young theorists from many countries and the organization of international conferences."

Selected publications 
Molinari has published more than 270 papers.
 D. Varsano et al., "A monolayer transition-metal dichalcogenide as a topological excitonic insulator", Nature Nanotechnology 15, 367 (2020)
 D'Amico, P., et al., "Intrinsic edge excitons in two-dimensional MoS2", Phys. Rev. B 101, 161410 (2020)
 M.O. Atambo et al., "Electronic and optical properties of doped TiO2 by many-body perturbation theory", Phys. Rev. Materials 3, 045401 (2919)
 A. Portone et al., "Tailoring optical properties and stimulated emission in nanostructured polythiophene", Scientific Reports 9, 7370 (2019
 J.O. Island et al, "Interaction-Driven Giant Orbital Magnetic Moments in Carbon Nanotubes", Phys. Rev. Letters 121, 127704 (2018)
 D. Varsano et al., "Carbon nanotubes as excitonic insulators", Nature Comm. 8, 1461 (2017)
 A. De Sio et al., "Tracking the coherent generation of polaron pairs in conjugated polymers", Nature Comm. 7, 13742 (2016)
 L. Bursi et al. "Quantifying the Plasmonic Character of Optical Excitations in Nanostructures", ACS Photonics 3, 520 (2016)
 G. Soavi, "Exciton-exciton annihilation and biexciton stimulated emission in graphene nanoribbons", Nature Comm.7, 11010 (2016)
 S. Falke et al, "Coherent ultrafast charge transfer in an organic photovoltaic blend", Science 344, 1001 (2014)
 R. Denk et al, "Exciton Dominated Optical Response of Ultra-Narrow Graphene Nanoribbons", Nature Comm 5, 4253 (2014)
 C. A. Rozzi et al, "Quantum coherence controls the charge separation in a prototypical artificial light-harvesting system", Nature Comm 4, 1602 (2013)
 P. Ruffieux et al, "Electronic Structure of Atomically Precise Graphene Nanoribbons", ACS Nano 6, 6930 (2012)
 S. Kalliakos et al, "A molecular state of correlated electrons in a quantum dot", Nature Physics 4, 467 - 471 (2008)
 D. Prezzi et al, "Optical properties of graphene nanoribbons: The role of many-body effects", Phys Rev B77, 041404 (2008)
 A. Ferretti et al, "Mixing of electronic states in pentacene adsorption on copper", Phys Rev Lett 99, 046802 (2007)
 J. Maultzsch et al, "Exciton binding energies in carbon nanotubes from two-photon photoluminescence", Phys Rev B 72, 241402 (2005)
 A. Ferretti et al, "First-principles theory of correlated transport through nanojunctions", Phys Rev Lett 94, 116802 (2005)

References 

Fellows of the American Physical Society
American Physical Society
20th-century  Italian  physicists
20th-century American women scientists
Italian women physicists